Scott John Garner (born 20 September 1989) is an English former professional footballer who played as a defender.

He has previously played for Leicester City, Ilkeston Town, Mansfield Town, Grimsby Town, Alfreton Town, Cambridge United, Lincoln City, FC Halifax Town and Guiseley.

Club career

Leicester City
Born in Coventry, West Midlands, Garner began his career at Leicester City, signing a professional contract at the end of the 2007–08 season. On 21 October 2008, Garner was loaned, initially for one month and later extended, to non-league side Ilkeston Town, managed by David Holdsworth.

Mansfield Town
When Holdsworth was later appointed Mansfield Town manager, he signed Garner on a free transfer from Leicester on 8 January 2009.

Within his first few games for the Stags, Garner had won the Conference National Player of the Month award for January. In the four games he played over the month, Mansfield were unbeaten, conceding just one goal, with Garner scoring the winner in a 2–1 victory over Eastbourne Borough. A day after receiving the award, Garner was sent off for the first time in his career against York City. He captained the side, at the age of just 19, in a 2–0 win over Altrincham in April, scoring the opening goal.

In the 2009–10 season, in the absence of club captain Gary Mills, Garner regularly took over the captain's armband.

Grimsby Town

Garner signed for newly relegated Conference team Grimsby Town on a two-year contract on 7 July 2010. After struggling to make an impact at Grimsby he was loaned too Alfreton Town on 8 February 2011. On 29 March 2011, Grimsby's new managerial team of Paul Hurst and Rob Scott recalled Garner to the Grimsby team following a defensive injury crisis. After playing 31 times in two years, Garner was told on 27 April 2012 that he no longer had a future at the club and was subsequently released.

Cambridge United
Following his release from The Mariners earlier in the close season, Garner was offered deals by several clubs. On 13 June 2012, he chose to sign a two-year contract with Cambridge United.
Having struggled to hold down a first team place at Cambridge, Garner joined Lincoln City on a two-month loan on 6 October 2012.

Non-League
In July 2013, Garner signed for Boston United on a long-term loan. He went on to play for FC Halifax Town before signing with Guiseley on 13 June 2018. Having returned for a second spell with Boston United in 2020, Garner joined Alfreton Town in June 2022.

On 2 August 2022, after completing pre-season with Alfreton, Garner announced he was retiring from football.

International career
Garner was named in the England C squad to play Hungary under-23's on 15 September 2009. He captained the side in a 1–1 draw. He was also named in the squad to play Poland under-23's in November 2009, though club commitments at Mansfield prevented him from playing the game.

On 12 May 2011 Garner and fellow Grimsby defender Rob Atkinson were called up for England C duty to play against Portugal on the 19th.

Career statistics

References

External links

1989 births
Living people
Footballers from Coventry
English footballers
Association football defenders
Leicester City F.C. players
Ilkeston Town F.C. (1945) players
Mansfield Town F.C. players
Grimsby Town F.C. players
Alfreton Town F.C. players
Cambridge United F.C. players
Lincoln City F.C. players
Boston United F.C. players
FC Halifax Town players
Guiseley A.F.C. players
National League (English football) players
England semi-pro international footballers